The 13th Asian Cross Country Championships took place on February 29, 2016 in Manama, Bahrain.

Medalists

Medal table

References

External links
 Results

Asian Cross Country Championships
Asian Cross Country
Asian Cross Country
Asian Cross Country
International athletics competitions hosted by Bahrain
Cross country running in Bahrain
Sport in Manama
21st century in Manama
February 2016 sports events in Asia